Nick Stephens (born May 19, 1987) is a former American football quarterback. He played college football at Tennessee and Tarleton State.

Early years
Stephens attended and played high school football at Flower Mound High School in Flower Mound, Texas.

College career
Stephens started attending the University of Tennessee in 2006 and began playing football in 2008 under head coach Phillip Fulmer. He started six of the seven games he played in, with a record of 63 completions in 130 attempts, gaining 840 yards and four touchdowns to go along with three interceptions. After the 2008 season, Fulmer was not retained as head coach. Under new head coach Lane Kiffin, he was used as a backup quarterback to Jonathan Crompton in 2009, completing 9-of-13 passes for 142 yards and one touchdown. In 2010, Stephens transferred to Tarleton State, completing 132-of-258 passes for 1,774 yards and nine touchdowns in eight games. In his senior year in 2011, he completed 242-of-429 passes for 3,005 yards and 29 touchdowns in 11 games.

Professional career

Tennessee Titans
Stephens signed with the Titans on April 30, 2012 as a rookie free agent. He was waived on August 26, 2012.

Dallas Cowboys
Stephens signed  with the Cowboys' practice squad on December 31, 2012. He was waived by the team on August 27, 2013.

Baltimore Ravens
Stephens signed with the Ravens' practice squad on October 30, 2013. He was waived by the team on May 30, 2014.

References

External links
Tennessee Volunteers bio
Tarleton State Texans bio

1987 births
Living people
American football quarterbacks
Players of American football from Texas
People from Flower Mound, Texas
Tennessee Volunteers football players
Tarleton State Texans football players
Utah Blaze players
San Jose SaberCats players
Baltimore Ravens players